Alan Chan Heng Loon (born 22 February 1953) is a former Singaporean civil servant. He was the former chief executive of the Singapore Press Holdings.

Early life
Chan was born to a bilingual family fluent in English and Chinese. He studied in Haig Boys School, Raffles Institution and National Junior College. He was awarded the President's Scholarship and French Government Scholarship, and graduated with a Dip Ingenieur from Ecole Nationale de L'Aviation Civile in 1978. He subsequently went to INSEAD and obtained an MBA in 1983.

Career
After studying in France, Chan worked as a civil servant under various Singaporean government ministries. Chan served as the Ministry of Defence’s Director of  Manpower.  In 1994 Chan successfully applied to be the Principal Private Secretary of Senior Minister Lee Kuan Yew (as he then was). Thereafter, Chan was appointed as Deputy Secretary at the Ministry of Foreign Affairs. Strict on making his subordinates speak Chinese properly, he imposed a ten-cent fine on whoever who used English terms in their Chinese conversations. He rose to the position of Permanent Secretary of the Ministry of Communications and Information and the Ministry of Transport before retiring from the civil service to join Singapore Press Holdings (SPH). In total, his career as a government official spanned some 25 years. Becoming Group President of the Singapore-based media firm SPH in July 2002, it was in January 2003 that he became the company's chief executive officer. He is also part of its board of directors. Mr Chan retired from SPH on 1 September 2017. He was appointed Chairman of the Land Transport Authority of Singapore on 1 April 2016. Chan was listed as one of "100 Inspiring Rafflesians" and described as "a Rafflesian who has crossed many boundaries" by Guan Heng Tan in 2008. Chan contributed an essay titled "My Tryst With Chinese" for Lee Kuan Yew's 2012 book, My Lifelong Challenge: Singapore's Bilingual Journey. He was selected by INSEAD in 2009 as one of the "50 Alumni who changed the world".

Personal life
Chan is married with two children, a boy and a girl. Chan has three older siblings. His brother Heng Wing was Ambassador to Thailand, and one of his sisters, Heng Chee was Ambassador to the United States.

References

1953 births
Living people
Members of the Public Service Commission (Singapore)
Permanent secretaries of Singapore
Singaporean people of Chinese descent
Raffles Institution alumni